Karavaevi Dachi is railway station in Kyiv, Ukraine. It is served by local Ukrzaliznytsia trains Kyivpastrans' Kyiv Urban Rail.

Railway stations in Kyiv
Southwestern Railways stations
Railway stations opened in 1926